Persitz is a surname. Notable people with the surname include:

Alexandre Persitz (1910–1975), French architect
Raaphi Persitz (1934–2009), English–Israeli–Swiss chess master and financial analyst
Shoshana Persitz (1892–1969), Israeli politician, educator, and Zionist activist